Irving Bustamante is a Paralympic athlete from Cuba competing mainly in category T13 sprint events.

Irving competed in the 2004 Summer Paralympics, winning a silver as part of the Cuban 4 × 100 m team and two individual bronze medals in the 100m and 200m.

References

Paralympic athletes of Cuba
Athletes (track and field) at the 2004 Summer Paralympics
Paralympic silver medalists for Cuba
Paralympic bronze medalists for Cuba
Cuban male sprinters
Living people
Medalists at the 2004 Summer Paralympics
Year of birth missing (living people)
Paralympic medalists in athletics (track and field)
21st-century Cuban people